Making Waves may refer to;

Making Waves (TV series), a British television drama series
Making Waves: The Art of Cinematic Sound, 2019 documentary film about sound design in film
Making Waves (The Nolans album)
Making Waves Canada
Making Waves (software)
Making Waves: Irving Dardik and His Superwave Principle
"Making Waves", a song by Status Quo from the album Under the Influence